7th Day is a 2014 Indian Malayalam-language neo-noir action thriller film directed by Syamdhar (in his directorial debut) and written by Akhil Paul. It stars Prithviraj Sukumaran as David Abraham, a 42-year-old IPS officer who is on a trail of an unnatural case. The film also features Tovino Thomas, Anu Mohan, Vinay Forrt, Yog Japee, Janani Iyer and Praveen Prem in substantial roles. 7th Day was a commercial success of the year at the box office.

Plot 

The story starts with a monologue by David Abraham (Prithviraj Sukumaran), IPS during the night of Christmas. When he leaves a party, he gets involved in an accident with Shan (Vinay Forrt) and Vinu (Anu Mohan). David takes them to the hospital to treat Vinu's injury which he sustained while falling off the bike. From the hospital Vinu escapes, to Shan's horror. David starts to suspect that there is something wrong. But Shan says there is no problem and David drops him at his place. Then he notices that Vinu has dropped his wallet in his jeep.

Shan recounts the story of his friends - Ebineser aka Aby (Tovino Thomas), Jessica aka Jessy (Janani Iyer), Cycle (Praveen Prem) and Vinu. Vinu runs an internet cafe. Cycle is the son of a gulf-returnee with a lot of financial problems. Shan is a local correspondent for a newspaper. Aby and Jessica grew up together in an orphanage, and Vinu has a special interest for Jessica and Jessica to him. One day, Vinu's internet cafe is raided by the police looking for some stuff. Since they couldn't find anything, the police returns without saying anything to Vinu. That night, Vinu's house is raided by a goon named Charlie (Yog Japee), who is commissioned by Christopher Moriarty, a fearsome crime boss with a near mythical reputation, to locate a missing sum of Rs. 1crore 75lakhs. They suspect that Vinu took the money from them and gives 36 hours to surrender the money to him.

Later David receives a call from a local travel agent that someone has given him a fake note of thousand rupees to book a bus ticket to Bangalore. David catches him from the bus and it turns out it is Cycle who was trying to get out of the town. Using Cycle, David locates his other friends - Vinu and Jessica. Aby is nowhere to be seen. David asks Vinu to recount the happenings of the night of his suicide. Though at first he tells them a lie, under pressure Vinu tells David that Aby had planned everything and stole the cash so he could kill Vinu because of his secret love for Jessica, but Jessica and Cycle were hearing all this. Jessica said she could not forgive him for trying to kill Vinu. With guilt Aby tells them that the money is in the vehicle and commits suicide by jumping off a waterfall. Coincidentally Aby's blood group was the same as Vinu's and they both had the same tattoo, so they decide to use Aby's suicide to fake Vinu's death.

After their confession David reveals that Aby was a carrier for Christopher and the money in the bag was grade one counterfeit cash. David gave them the option of either leaving the money on the table so that he can report it as an abandoned bag of counterfeit money and that no one would ever disturb them about it or arrest them and take them to the court for planned murder. They chose the first option and handed the money over to David and left. When they left, however, Shan stops the car and questions the true identity of David Abraham, and the simple option given to them. They have a light-bulb realization that David Abraham IPS doesn't exist and that David is actually Christopher Moriarty.

Cast
 Prithviraj Sukumaran as David Abraham IPS / Christopher Moriarty
 Tovino Thomas as Aby Ebineser
 Vinay Forrt as Shan Shahar
 Janani Iyer as Jessie
 Anu Mohan as Vinu Ramachandran
 Praveen Prem as Cyril Samuel aka Cycle
 Joy Mathew as P.T.R. Bhattathiri
 Yog Japee as Charlie
 Lakshmi Priya as Lab Technician
 Shobha Mohan as Vinu's mother
 Sreedevi Unni as Sr. Veronica
 Gayathri
 Sunil Sukhada as Security Simon

Soundtrack
The songs of the film is composed by Deepak Dev and The Film Includes 3 Songs.

Release
The film was released on 12 April 2014.

Box office
7th Day was a commercial success. In Kerala, the film earned 40 crore in distributor's share in 50 days run.

References

External links
 

2014 films
2010s Malayalam-language films
2014 crime thriller films
2014 directorial debut films
Indian crime thriller films